David Jai Crawford (born 4 August 1983) is an Australian former professional road cyclist. He was born in Hobart.

Major results

2007
 1st  Overall Tour of Siam
 2nd Overall Tour de East Java
 5th Overall Tour de Langkawi
2008
 2nd Overall Tour of Japan
 3rd Overall Tour de East Java
 8th Overall Tour de Kumano
2009
 2nd Overall Tour de Langkawi
 2nd Overall Jelajah Malaysia
 2nd Overall Tour de Korea
 8th Overall Tour of Wellington
1st Stage 3
2010
 4th Overall Tour of Utah
1st Stage 5
 8th Overall Tour of Wellington
2011
 4th Overall Tour de Filipinas
 7th Overall Tour de Kumano
 9th Overall Tour de Taiwan
2012
 2nd Overall Jelajah Malaysia
1st Stage 2
 2nd Overall Tour de Singkarak
2013
 7th Overall Tour of Borneo
 10th Overall Tour de Kumano
2014
 7th Overall Tour de Kumano
 8th Overall New Zealand Cycle Classic
2015
 7th Overall Tour de Singkarak
 8th Overall Tour de Kumano
 10th Tour de Okinawa
2016
 1st  Overall Tour de Ijen
1st Stage 4
 2nd Tour de Okinawa
 4th Overall Tour de Flores
1st  Mountains classification
 6th Overall Tour de Kumano
 7th Overall Tour de Hokkaido
2017
 1st  Overall Tour de Filipinas
 2nd Overall Tour de Tochigi
 2nd Overall Tour de Molvccas
 4th Overall Tour de Lombok
 4th Tour de Okinawa
 6th Overall Tour de Ijen
 10th Overall Tour de Flores
2018
 9th Overall Sharjah Tour

References

External links

1983 births
Living people
Australian male cyclists
Sportspeople from Hobart